"Rise Above 1" is a single from the soundtrack of the Broadway rock musical Spider-Man: Turn Off the Dark, released in May 2011. The song was recorded by Reeve Carney, who portrays Peter Parker/Spider-Man in the musical, along with co-writers Bono and the Edge of U2. Another version of the song contains the cast from the musical, titled "Rise Above 2".

The single peaked at number 74 on the Billboard Hot 100, becoming Carney's first single to chart.

Performances
Carney, Bono, and the Edge performed the song live on the season finale of the 10th season of American Idol..

Music video
A music video directed by Aaron Platt and Joseph Toman premiered in July 2011. It was produced by Jonathan Lia via GOODCOMPANY.

Critical reception
Giving 3 stars out of 5, Jon Dolan of Rolling Stone magazine said that the song "may become a metaphor for its slog towards redemption." Victoria Meng of TheCelebrityCafe was critical of the song, saying it "tries to sound good and somewhat succeeds", but that the song didn't convey the true personality of Spider-Man.

Chart performance
The song debuted on the Billboard Hot 100 the week of June 11, 2011 after being performed live on American Idol.

References

External links

2011 debut singles
2011 songs
Songs written by Bono
Songs written by the Edge
Interscope Records singles
Song recordings produced by Alex da Kid
Songs about fictional male characters
Spider-Man in music
Songs from musicals